Bacillus infernus is a thermophilic, strictly anaerobic bacterium of the genus Bacillus that lives in deep terrestrial subsurface areas.

Popular culture
Bacillus infernus premiered in the 2008 The Andromeda Strain (miniseries). The bacteria's origin was erroneously attributed to hydrothermal vents instead of a buried triassic rift basin.

References

External links
Type strain of Bacillus infernus at BacDive -  the Bacterial Diversity Metadatabase

infernus